Mark Samuel Hoplamazian (born November 27, 1963) is an Armenian American businessman, who has been the president and CEO of Hyatt Hotels Corporation since December 2006. Through marriage he is a member of the Kohler family.

Early life  
Hoplamazian was born on November 27, 1963 in Bryn Mawr, Pennsylvania to Harry (1924-1977) and Victoria (née Sarkisian) Hoplamazian (1924-2022).

His father was a landscape gardener and owner of Mayfield Gardens, Inc. in Newtown Square, Pennsylvania. He has two brothers and two sisters, and is of Armenian descent. 

He was educated at the private Episcopal Academy in Newtown Square, and received his BA in economics from Harvard College, and his MBA from the University of Chicago Booth School of Business.

Career 
Between 1985 and 1987, Hoplamazian worked for First Boston Corporation in New York, as a financial analyst. Since 1987, he has been employed in the Pritzker Organization, where he last was executive president, where he worked under Jay Pritzker and primarily managed their family office. In 1988, he was a summer associate at Boston Consulting Group. He was a vice president of the Hyatt Global Corporation since 2004, and president since 2006.

Personal life 
On September 28, 1991, he married Rachel DeYoung Kohler (b. 1963), daughter of billionaire businessman Herbert Kohler Jr. (1939–2022). They have three children, Mara, Lena and Leo.

The family resides in Lincoln Park, Illinois.

References

External links
 LinkedIn profile
 

Living people
Hyatt people
Harvard College alumni
University of Chicago Booth School of Business alumni
Place of birth missing (living people)
American chief executives of travel and tourism industry companies
1963 births